Aleksander August Veidermann (also Aleksander Veiderma; 7 April 1888 – 23 February 1972 Tallinn) was an Estonian politician.

1922-1923 he was Minister of Education.

References

1888 births
1972 deaths
Education ministers of Estonia
Members of the Estonian Constituent Assembly
Members of the Estonian National Assembly